Greatest Hits is a collection of material by Robyn Hitchcock and the Egyptians from the A&M period 1988-1992, spanning the albums Globe of Frogs, Queen Elvis, Perspex Island, and Respect.

The collection also includes various hard-to-find B-Sides, which acted as a strong selling point for Hitchcock's fans, including Legalized Murder, Ruling Class, Dark Green Energy and Bright Fresh Flower. In addition, two cover songs are included –  Bryan Ferry's More Than This and a live recording of The Byrds' Eight Miles High.

It was released as part of A&M's Backlot Digital Remasters Series on September 9, 1996.

Track listing
 Balloon Man  03:34
 Vibrating  03:01
 Flesh Number One (Beatle Dennis)  02:40
 A Globe of Frogs (electric version)  04:29 (B-side for Balloon Man single 1988)
 Legalized Murder  04:08 (B-side for Flesh Number One (Beatle Dennis) single 1988)
 Intro to "Eyes"  02:44 live intro to One Long Pair of Eyes.  (Excerpt from Madonna of the Wasps EP 1989)
 One Long Pair Of Eyes  04:59
 Madonna Of The Wasps  03:06
 Wax Doll  04:14
 More Than This  03:52 (by Bryan Ferry) (From Madonna of the Wasps EP 1989)
 Ruling Class  03:25 (B-Side for Madonna of the Wasps single, 1989)
 So You Think You're In Love  02:35
 Oceanside  03:45
 Ride  05:01
 She Doesn't Exist  04:26
 Dark Green Energy  03:14 (B-side for So You Think You're In Love single 1991)
 Eight Miles High  03:58 (by Clark, David Crosby and McGuinn) (from So You Think You're In Love CD single)
 Driving Aloud (Radio Storm)  04:00
 The Yip Song  03:08
 Alright, Yeah  02:57 (B-side for Driving Aloud single 1992)
 Bright Fresh Flower  03:22 (B-side for The Yip Song single 1992)

All songs by Robyn Hitchcock except where indicated.

External links
 

1996 greatest hits albums
Robyn Hitchcock albums
A&M Records compilation albums